Acanthopelma is a genus of tarantulas that was first described by Frederick Octavius Pickard-Cambridge in 1897.  it contains two species, found in Central America and South America: A. beccarii and A. rufescens.

See also
 List of Theraphosidae species

References

Theraphosidae genera
Spiders of South America
Taxa named by Frederick Octavius Pickard-Cambridge
Theraphosidae